Cosmopterix nanshanella is a moth of the family Cosmopterigidae. It is known from Zhejiang, China.

The length of the forewings is about 6 mm.

References

nanshanella